Ghlig Ehel Boye  is a village and rural commune in the Hodh Ech Chargui Region of south-eastern Mauritania.

In 2000 it had a population of 4564.

References

Communes of Hodh Ech Chargui Region